The statue of Judah Loew ben Bezalel is an outdoor sculpture by Ladislav Šaloun, installed at New City Hall in Prague, Czech Republic.

A replica from 1914 by Ladislav Saloun is in the Maisel Synagogue in Prague. The replica has a plaque, which states that the statue’s theme is the Maharal’s death. His death is symbolized by the nude young girl holding out a rose “whose scent brings about his end”. There is a small dog on the statue’s other side, but no description of the meaning of the dog is given.

References

External links

 

Monuments and memorials in Prague
Old Town (Prague)
Outdoor sculptures in Prague
Sculptures of men in Prague
Statues in Prague